The Model 1892 revolver (also known as the "Lebel revolver" and the "St. Etienne 8mm") is a French service revolver produced by Manufacture d'armes de Saint-Étienne as a replacement for the MAS 1873 revolver. It was the standard issue sidearm for officers in the French military during the First World War.

The Modèle 1892 revolver is a solid frame revolver with the cylinder on a separate frame swinging right for manual reloading. The Modèle 1892 was first fielded in 1893 and was prominent among French military officers during First World War, and later the French police until the mid-1960s.

A mechanically tight and very well finished handgun, the Modèle 1892 fires 8mm rounds with a striking power equivalent to that of a .32 ACP round. It also features a smaller calibre than many other military revolvers of that time period, including the Webley revolver and its predecessor the MAS 1873 revolver.

History

Though it was originally designed to serve as a commissioned officer's personal sidearm, over 350,000  Modèle 1892 revolvers were manufactured between 1892 and 1924. It was issued in the French Army, French Navy, and French Gendarmerie, amongst others. It is commonly, but mistakenly, called a "Lebel revolver" after the name of Colonel Nicolas Lebel, although there is no evidence whatsoever that Lebel had any involvement in the creation of the gun or its ammunition. Non-commissioned officers continued to carry the older Mle 1873 service revolver, but were also frequently issued .32 ACP automatic pistols (the Ruby pistol) during World War I.  The Mle 1892 was later officially replaced by semi-automatic pistols in 1935 but many saw service during World War II and were brought to the United States as souvenirs.

A Modèle 1892 was used in the 2018 Strasbourg attack.

Mechanics
Originally chambered for an 8mm black-powder cartridge closely resembling the .32-20 WCF round, later models issued during World War I and thereafter fired the same 8mm cartridge loaded with smokeless powder. The Mle 1892 revolver is a double-action solid-frame design, with chambers being accessed by swinging out the cylinder to the right. The fired cases can then be pushed out of the cylinder at the same time. After reloading, the cylinder is swung back into the frame and locked into place with the case-hardened loading gate located on the right side of the frame. In addition, the left sideplate of the frame can be swung back on a hinge to give access to the gun's internal parts for oiling or cleaning.  These parts were individually numbered to indicate the order in which they can be disassembled. The year of manufacture of each revolver is engraved on the right side of the barrel, for instance "S 1895.  The inscription "Mle 1892 is hand engraved on top of the barrel.  It was carried in a large closed leather holster, which held an additional 12 rounds of ammunition hidden below the flap.

Legacy
The Mle 1892 is a mechanically tight, accurate and very well finished revolver. It can be fired single-action by cocking the hammer first or by double-action by a full trigger pull. Its downside is the relative weakness, for a military handgun, of its 8×27mm ammunition.  In terms of striking power, it just barely reaches the level of the .32 ACP.

Users
 

 
 
 : Adopted by the São Paulo Public Force in 1911 following the French military mission
 
 
: Compagnie des Carabiniers du Prince
 : Captured examples were re-issued as the Revolver 637 (f)

Notes

References

 
 
 

8 mm firearms
Early revolvers
Revolvers of France
Military revolvers
French World War I small arms
World War II infantry weapons of France
Double-action revolvers
Black-powder pistols